Constantin N. Dinculescu (November 23, 1898, Alexandria, Romania  September 15, 1990) was a Romanian energy engineer and educator.

Dinculescu designed the electrification of the Bucharest-Brașov railway for Căile Ferate Române, implemented between 1959 and 1966.  Serving as rector of the Polytechnic University of Bucharest between August 1954 and January 1956, and then between December 1956 and April 1968, he contributed to the development of energy engineering education in Romania, introducing a nuclear energy engineering discipline to the curriculum.

He was awarded the Order of Labor in 1963. He became a corresponding member of the Romanian Academy in March 1952, advancing to titular member in January 1990, after the Romanian Revolution.

Notes

References
M Olteneanu, C. Rucăreanu, “Martin Bercovici-Un om între oameni“, Publisher of the Romanian Academy, 2001
File din istoria energeticii romanesti, vol II, Publisher Nergo, 2007

External links
 Mihai Olteneanu - Acad. Constantin N. Dinculescu (1898 – 1990) Fost rector al Politehnicii bucureștene, inițiator al construcției complexului de clădiri ale noului local, Engineering Univers
 Sorin Costinaș - Development of romanian power engineering in mid  20th century, Noema, vol. III, Nr. 1, 2004
 Nicolae Aurelian Diaconescu - Constantin Dinculescu, poezie.ro

Titular members of the Romanian Academy
Academic staff of the Politehnica University of Bucharest
Academic staff of the Politehnica University of Timișoara
Rectors of Politehnica University of Bucharest
20th-century Romanian engineers
Căile Ferate Române people
1898 births
1990 deaths